Inter City Bus Terminal (ICBT) is an upcoming bus terminus at Miyapur area of the Indian city of Hyderabad. It is owned by the HMDA and operated under a public–private partnership. The terminal once completed, would be one of the largest in Asia. The buses belonging to TSRTC will  operate here. It will be one of the largest bus stations in India, with 200 bus bays. The project was cancelled in June 2018

Location 
It is under Planning stage on 70 acres located on Miyapur-Kompally  Intermediate Ring Road connecting NH-65 & NH-44. It is 2 km from Hyderabad Metro's station, 2 km from  Inner Ring Road and 4 km from Outer Ring Road.

The Terminal 
The terminal is being built with 200 bus bays and 30 city bus bays.  The infrastructure for 1,000 buses to idle along between arrivals and departures. It will have a 1 lakh sft of commuter and passenger terminal space.  The total cost is 100 crores.

History 
After repeated delays it was approved in June 2011 and is expected to be completed by the end of 2019.

The other existing bus stations in Hyderabad are Mahatma Gandhi Bus Station and Jubilee Bus Station.

References 

Transport in Telangana
Transport in Hyderabad, India
Bus stations in Telangana
Buildings and structures in Hyderabad, India